Banana Sundae (formerly Banana Split) is a Philippine comedy gag show broadcast by ABS-CBN. The show aired from October 11, 2008, to April 5, 2020, replacing That's My Doc. The program aired every Sunday from 2:30 PM to 3:30 PM, on the network's Yes Weekend! block. It also airs worldwide via TFC.

This series is currently streaming on Kapamilya Online Live Global every Fridays, 3:00am-5:00am.

History
Banana Split is a spiritual successor to the comedy program Goin' Bananas that featured Edgar Mortiz, Christopher de Leon, Jay Ilagan, and Johnny Delgado.

Banana Split debuted on October 11, 2008, with an all-girl cast led by Angelica Panganiban and Cristine Reyes, with different male celebrity guests each week. The second season premiered on February 28, 2009, and the third season on April 18, 2009, with a new cast, including John Prats, Zanjoe Marudo, Jayson Gainza, Pooh, and Pokwang. The fourth season premiered on July 18, 2009. On September 30, 2009, a 30-minute weekday afternoon edition called Banana Split: Daily Servings originally aired every Mondays to Fridays on the network's Hapontastic afternoon block. The timeslot later moved to Umaganda weekday morning block from 10:00AM to 10:30AM starting August 2010, but was moved again twice as early from 9:00AM to 9:30AM on June 27, 2011. On July 9, 2011, the original Saturday edition was reformatted as Banana Split: Extra Scoop, featuring live comedy performances and also includes the second season of Clown in a Million segment, a reality comedy search. On September 12, 2011, Banana Split: Daily Servings was renamed to Banana Split: Lafternoon Delight as the timeslot moved to 2:45PM as part of Kapamilya Gold afternoon block. However, it was later cancelled on October 7, 2011.

Banana Split: Extra Scoop garnered high ratings on its Saturday late-night timeslot compare to the counterpart programs. Due to the success, ABS-CBN launched a late-weeknight edition called Banana Nite which premiered on February 25, 2013, every Mondays to Fridays right after Bandila, replacing certain Current Affairs shows. Banana Nite extended its airtime to 45 minutes on August 5, 2013, but was later reverted to 30 minutes on February 10, 2014, onwards. Banana Nite ended on October 30, 2015, after a two-year run. Meanwhile, Banana Split: Extra Scoop ended on November 7, 2015, after its four-year run. The show reformatted on November 15, 2015, as Banana Sundae which now airs every Sunday afternoons at 2:30PM right after ASAP Natin 'To.

In April 2020, Banana Sundae was temporarily put off the air, in response to rival network GMA extending Kapuso Movie Festival to a two-movie block. This switch forced the network to extend the Sunday edition of KB Family Weekend to two movies, causing ASAP Natin 'To shorten to a 1-hour airtime in Banana Sundae's timeslot, as part of ABS-CBN's temporary programming changes due to the 2020 Luzon lockdown (which is part of the COVID-19 pandemic in the country). However, the program was cancelled when ABS-CBN Channel 2 was forced to shut down indefinitely. Repeat episodes  of the program later aired via ABS-CBN's interim replacement, Kapamilya Channel every weeknight at 11:45PM between June and July 2020.

Through an article from Philippine Entertainment Portal, a gag show similar to Banana Sundae (considered its "successor") started airing on October 18, 2020, on TV5 produced by Brightlight Productions. However, the program was retitled as Sunday 'Kada with only a few of its cast and director, Mortiz, of Banana Sundae on board.

Cast
Final cast

Angelica Panganiban (2008–2020)
John Prats (2009–2020)
Jayson Gainza (2009–2020)
Pooh (2009–2020)
Bangs Garcia (2009–2020)
Pokwang (2009-2011; 2015-2020)
Badjie Mortiz (2009-2020)
Ryan Bang (2010–2020)
Jobert Austria (2011–2020)
Sunshine Garcia (2011–2020)
JC de Vera (2013–2020)
Aiko Climaco (2013–2020)
Ritz Azul (2017–2020)
Wacky Kiray (2017–2020)
 Barbie Imperial (2020)

Former cast
Cristine Reyes 
Roxanne Guinoo 
Valerie Concepcion 
Dianne Medina (2008–2009)
Princess Ryan (2008–2010)
RR Enriquez (2008–2011)
Zanjoe Marudo (2009–2010; 2013–2015)
Niña Jose (2009–2010)
A.A. Ponce (2009–2011)
Rasheed Collado (2009-2011)
Melai Cantiveros (2010–2015)
Gab Valenciano (2010–2011)
Jason Francisco (2010–2012)
Jef Gaitan (2010–2015)
Le Chazz (2010–2015)
Alora Sasam (2012–2015)
Boom Labrusca (2012–2015)
Manuel Chua (2013–2015)
Alex Gonzaga (2013–2015)
Kean Cipriano (2013–2015)
Jennica Garcia (2014)
Mitoy Yonting (2014–2015)
Jessy Mendiola (2015–2017)
Shine Kuk  (2017–2018) 
Saicy Aguila

Portions

Final portions/segments
 Aquiknow and Aboonduh Tonite - A parody of defunct late-night talk show Aquino & Abunda Tonight hosted by Kris Aquino and Boy Abunda. This portion is played by Angelica Panganiban as Krissy Aquiknow, and Jayson Gainza as Bhoy Aboonduh.
 Krissy TV - A parody of defunct morning talk show Kris TV hosted by Kris Aquino. It is portrayed by Angelica Panganiban as Krissy Aquiknow, Jayson Gainza as Krissy's assistant Dharla (a parody of Kris TV headwriter Darla Sauler), and John Prats as Bimby Aquino Yap.
 Clown in a Million - The talent search for comedians, where funny people with no or little television experience battle it out to be proclaimed as the latest comedic talent discovery.
 Banana Classics - A sketch or comic skit where two or more actors portray roles to convey a simple story that culminates in a punchline, just to make people laugh. It is done before a live audience without cuts, thus requiring the material to be visual rather than verbal.
 Extra Spoof - A segment where the cast impersonates famous icons, idols, and celebrities of past and present times, living or deceased. It is cohesively presented with a common theme like novelty icons, the icons from the 80s, 90s, and 2000s, or internationally known Pinoy singers.
 Make Me Rap - 
 Oh My Shopping! - A parody of O Shopping where the cast is asked to pick a certain item from a chosen box which they need to sell like an infomercial show.

 Former segments (from Banana Nite and Banana Sundae)
 Barado Sisters (later as "Hala Bara!")
 Eto na Post
 Kandila (parody of late-night newscast Bandila)
 Ihaw Na! (parody of Ikaw Na!, a defunct Bandila segment)
 Krissy and Me (parody of Kris TV)
 Laugh Three
 "Painting"
 Surprise Bwi-set
 Tres Kumpares
 Rated SSPG: Sobra-Sobrang Pilyong Gags, Bawal Sa Bata, Tulog Na! (a parody of MTRCB's SPG rating advisory, a collection of green jokes)
 Chazz Do It
 Yaya and Angel (parody of Ang Spoiled, a sketch from rival gag show Bubble Gang)
 Mr. Bang (parody of Mr. Bean)
 Aquiknow & Aboonduh Tonite (parody of Aquino & Abunda Tonight)
 Sosyal, 'Di Sosyal
 Banana Recap
 Monday Funday
 Timeless Tuesday
 Wayback Wednesday
 Throwback Thursday
 Flashback Friday
 Maling Akala
 Dr. Selfie
 Balitang Six-Six
 Fake Yan
 Pag May Time
 Kontra Pick-Up
 Pinoy True Stories parodies
 TnT: Tapatan ni Tunting (parody of Tapatan ni Tunying)
 Bistodo (parody of Bistado)
 Kutya ng Masa (parody of Mutya ng Masa)
 How Dare You (parody of reality show I Dare You)
 Single, In a Relationship, It's Complicated
 Munting Kaalaman
 Pogi vs. Tambay
 Hot Issue
 Brad Bro Bru
 Isang Tanong, Isang Sagot

Former portions/segments

Clown in a Million: Season 2 (2011)

Elimination chart

 The contestant won the competition
 The contestant was eliminated
 The contestant won the wild card round.
 The contestant won immunity from the next elimination
 The contestant was deemed the worst but was immune from elimination

Controversies

Theme song
Lito Camo composed the theme song Banana Split performed by Kool Chix, and is available as a bonus track in Willie Revillame's album Giling Giling from Star Records. However, the theme song was changed during the third season, which is a re-composition of The Champs' Tequila.

Gay kiss issue

During the December 6, 2008, episode, coverboys Rafael Rosell, Jon Avila and Will Devaughn were involved in a practical joke segment following a dating game format, where they kissed an extra gay instead of the Banana Split girls. This event caused a short rift between Rafael and a Banana Split executive producer. As a result, few clips were aired instead of the whole segment. A public apology was also delivered after the end of the show.

Casting cut-out

Valerie Concepcion, Roxanne Guinoo and Dianne Medina left Banana Split to focus on Precious Hearts Romances series where they will act in different episodes. It was reported that Guinoo was removed from the show because of her weight problems, while Concepcion left the show due to a talent fee dispute. The rift between Angelica Panganiban and Cristine Reyes arose as another issue, resulting in Reyes' departure.

John Prats and Jason Francisco Altercation
Cast members John Prats and Jason Francisco figured in an altercation during rehearsals for a show in 2013 to be held at the Music Museum. The two parties eventually patched things up a year later.

Binay Blackface skit
Banana Sundae attracted controversy prior to the May 13, 2019, elections when they aired a skit parodying the church argument of Binay siblings Abby Binay and Junjun Binay, who were both Makati mayoral candidates. Pooh and former SexBomb Girls member Sunshine Garcia played as the Binay siblings, putting black makeup on themselves. The skit drew mixed reactions with viewers calling it "racist and insensitive" as well as referencing the history of blackface, while others noted that the show never mocked skin color, but instead, the argument itself and the political history of the Binay family.

SPG rating
Banana Sundae is given an SPG rating by the Movie and Television Review and Classification Board (MTRCB) due to themes and strong languages not suitable for very young audiences.

Accolades
 24th PMPC Star Awards for Television's "Best Gag Show" – Banana Split (Won)
 24th PMPC Star Awards for Television's "Best Comedy Actress" – Angelica Panganiban (Won)
 23rd PMPC Star Awards for Television's "Best Gag Show" – Banana Split (Won – tied with GMA-7's Bubble Gang) 
 27th PMPC Star Awards for Television's "Best Gag Show" – Banana Split: Extra Scoop (Won – tied with GMA-7's Bubble Gang)
 23rd PMPC Star Awards for Television's "Best Comedy Actor" – Pooh (Won)
 8th Gawad Tanglaw Best Comedy/Gag Show" – Banana Split (Won – tied with Goin' Bulilit)
 29th PMPC Star Awards for Television's "Best Gag Show" – Banana Split: Extra Scoop (Won)
 29rd PMPC Star Awards for Television's "Best Comedy Actor" – Jayson Gainza (Won)

See also

 Super Laff-In
 Bubble Gang
 Tropang Trumpo
 List of programs broadcast by ABS-CBN

References

External links
 
 

ABS-CBN original programming
Philippine comedy television series
Philippine television sketch shows
2008 Philippine television series debuts
2020 Philippine television series endings
2010s Philippine television series
2020s Philippine television series
Filipino-language television shows
Television series by Star Creatives
Parody television series
Television productions suspended due to the COVID-19 pandemic